Masselot is the name of a family whose origin has been attested since the Middle Ages in Flanders and in the County of Hainaut, at the Court of Mons. This family afforded persons from all kind of fields. This family is descended among others from William I of England. However, this is not attested for the Flemish branch.

The origin of this name is probably the Old French word macelote, which denominated a kind of bludgeon during the Middle Ages.

The Masselot are now living all over the France, but also in Canada (Ste-Hyacinthe) and in the United States (Vermont, Illinois) where the name has changed into Lashway after the mutation of the nickname Lajoie, which was attributed to the Canadian branch of the Masselot originally coming from Lorraine (Masselot-Lajoie). Members of this family are also living in Belgium (Mons), in Italy, in Ireland and in Germany (Lower Saxony, Rhineland-Palatinate and Sarre).

Personalities with this surname
 Adolphe Masselot, sculptor who realized some art works situated in the Nord-Pas-de-Calais region (France).
 Georges Masselot, colonel who participated to the Algerian War.

Notes

External links
 http://www.masselot.eu (The website of a French translation provider in Germany)

County of Hainaut
Surnames